Alicia Austin's Age of Dreams is a collection of drawings written and illustrated by Alicia Austin. It was published in 1978 by Donald M. Grant, Publisher, Inc. in an edition of 2,000 copies, of which 200 were bound in buckram, and signed by Austin. The book contains an introduction by George Barr, and an afterword by Austin.

References

 
 

1978 books
Books about visual art
Books illustrated by Alicia Austin
Donald M. Grant, Publisher books